Joseph Roland Andre Rousseau (December 8, 1929 – October 13, 2010) is a Canadian retired professional ice hockey defenceman who played two games in the National Hockey League for the Montreal Canadiens. Rollie is the brother of Guy and Bobby Rousseau.

Rousseau was born in Montreal, Quebec.

External links

1929 births
2010 deaths
Canadian ice hockey defencemen
Montreal Canadiens players
Ice hockey people from Montreal